Wrenshall School District, ISD #100 is a school district headquartered in Wrenshall, Minnesota. It is entirely in Carlton County. It is divided into elementary and secondary divisions.

History

In 2019 the Wrenshall district and the Carlton School District were in talks on the possibility of consolidating. By September 2020 a study was released stating that if Carlton and Wrenshall consolidated, the taxpayer in the former Carlton zone would pay two and one half times the rate that a Wrenshall zone taxpayer would. Some legislation that would have facilitated the merger was, in 2020, not passed by the Minnesota Legislature. Additionally the compositions of the school boards changed. 

The two school boards chose not to hold further discussions on consolidation after February 2021. On June 21, 2021, the Carlton School Board stated that it no longer wished to consolidate with Wrenshall.

Athletics
The Carlton and Wrensall school districts have a shared athletics team. By August 2021 the fact that Carlton was now in negotiations with Cloquet over a tuition agreement could impact the Carlton-Wrenshall team.

References

Further reading
 - Written by the superintendent

External links
 Wrenshall School District
School districts in Minnesota
Education in Carlton County, Minnesota